Kevin James O'Connor (born November 15, 1963) is an American actor, known for portraying character roles in major studio films such as F/X2, Lord of Illusions, The Mummy, Van Helsing, There Will Be Blood and G.I. Joe: The Rise of Cobra. He is a favorite of writer/directors Stephen Sommers and Paul Thomas Anderson, who often cast him in their films.

Life and career
Kevin J. O'Connor was born in Chicago, the son of James O'Connor, a retired Chicago police officer, and Patricia Connelly, a teacher. He has a brother, Christopher O'Connor (a Southside school teacher). In 1988, he was married to Jane Elizabeth Unrue. O'Connor trained for the stage at The Theatre School at DePaul University in Chicago, before making his big-screen debut as high school rebel and beatnik poet Michael Fitzsimmons in Francis Ford Coppola's Peggy Sue Got Married (1986). His next major part was quizzical newspaper reporter Taggerty Hayes in the HBO miniseries Tanner '88. He portrayed a young Ernest Hemingway in the 1988 film The Moderns, had a small role in 1989's Steel Magnolias, and a featured role in 1994's erotic thriller Color of Night, which starred Bruce Willis and Jane March.

O'Connor worked with writer/director Stephen Sommers on the 1998 science-fiction adventure Deep Rising. He subsequently appeared in Sommers' projects The Mummy, in which he played the not-to-be-trusted and materialistic Beni; Van Helsing, in which he played Count Dracula's devious servant (and Dr. Frankenstein's former assistant) Igor; and G.I. Joe: The Rise of Cobra, in which he portrayed Doctor Mindbender. O'Connor had a key supporting role in There Will Be Blood as Henry, the "brother" of Daniel Day-Lewis's oil man, Daniel Plainview. O'Connor also starred in John Candy's last film, Canadian Bacon; he portrayed Roy Boy, a suicidal, eccentric American intent on sabotaging Canada. He reunited with There Will Be Blood director Paul Thomas Anderson for a small role in The Master.

Filmography

Film

Television

References

External links

 
 
 

1963 births
Living people
Male actors from Chicago
American male film actors
American male stage actors
American male television actors
20th-century American male actors
21st-century American male actors